William Chilufya (born 25 December 1983 in Lusaka) is a Zambian footballer, whose last known club was 1º de Maio, of the Angolan league in 2011.

Career
The striker played previously with FC Civics of the Namibia Premier League, who was in the 2004-2005 season, named as the Namibia Sport Player of the Year. In 2007, Chilufya led the league in scoring with 17 goals. A feat also achieved in the 2001/02 league.

Clubs
  1998-2000 Katima Mulimo Wanderers
  2000-2002 Liverpool
  2002-2003 Blue Waters
 2003-2008 FC Civics
 2008–2009 Estrela Clube Primeiro de Maio

References

1983 births
Living people
Zambian footballers
Expatriate footballers in Angola
Association football forwards
Zambian expatriate sportspeople in Angola
Estrela Clube Primeiro de Maio players
F.C. Civics Windhoek players
Blue Waters F.C. players
Zambian expatriate sportspeople in Namibia
Sportspeople from Lusaka
Expatriate footballers in Namibia
Zambian expatriate footballers
Namibia Premier League players